By Night is the debut recording of New Zealand indie rock group The Bats, released in 1984.

In 1990, Flying Nun released the first three Bats EPs as Compiletely Bats. However, the track "My Way," from this EP, was omitted. It was added in the 2010 remastered reissue of the CD.

Critical reception
Trouser Press called it "paradoxically morose and exhilarating; each song a moody pop gem, with hints of the hard-strummed countryisms of Gram Parsons." PopMatters wrote that it balances "pop grace and idiosyncrasy."

Track listing

Personnel
Malcolm Grant - drums
Paul Kean  - backing vocals, bass
Robert Scott - lead vocals, guitar, piano
Kaye Woodward - backing vocals, guitar, 12-string guitar

References

1984 EPs
The Bats (New Zealand band) albums
Flying Nun Records EPs
Dunedin Sound albums